Meeting-of-the-Waters is a two-story brick home and property in Franklin, Tennessee that dates from 1800 and was listed on the National Register of Historic Places in 1982.  It has also been known as the Thomas Hardin Perkins House.

Construction
It was built by Thomas Hardin Perkins, who settled in Williamson County in 1800 and began building this home at the joining of the Big Harpeth River and the West Harpeth River.  It was completed c.1810 and "was one of the finest homes built in the
county before 1830".  It included Federal style detailing and is one of the oldest brick residences surviving in the county.

Other Buildings
Two other historic Williamson County houses were built by relative Nicholas Tate Perkins:
"Two Rivers", built by relative Nicholas Tate Perkins, a Williamson County designated historic resource
"River Grange", built c.1825 for his daughter, also a Williamson County designated historic resource

References

Houses on the National Register of Historic Places in Tennessee
Houses in Franklin, Tennessee
Federal architecture in Tennessee
Houses completed in 1809
National Register of Historic Places in Williamson County, Tennessee